Will to meaning may refer to:
 The Will to Meaning, a book by Viktor Frankl, founder of logotherapy
 Will to meaning (Frankl), a concept in logotherapy